Paul Smith is a leading British football journalist, currently chief football writer for tabloid newspaper The Sunday Mirror. He is a former British Sports Reporter of the Year. Before joining The Sunday Mirror he was a deputy editor of Match.

In 2002 Smith was at the centre of a security scare that made news headlines around the world, when despite the post–September 11 security measures put in place by the organisers of the 2002 World Cup, his press accreditation was collected by the wrong person. The real Paul Smith spent two hours being questioned by Korean police before being released to continue with his coverage of the tournament.

He is a semi-regular on Sky Sports 1's Sunday Supplement.

Notes

English sportswriters
English male non-fiction writers
Living people
Year of birth missing (living people)